Agylla flavitincta is a moth of the family Erebidae. It was described by Paul Dognin in 1899. It is found in Ecuador.

References

Moths described in 1899
flavitincta
Moths of South America